The William and Nora Ream House, near Dingle, Idaho, and also known as Arcadia Farm , was built around 1900.  It was listed on the National Register of Historic Places in 1991.

It is a two-and-a-half-story Queen Anne/Colonial Revival house.  Built during 1900 to 1905, it is a very late example of a Queen Anne house in which many Colonial Revival elements are included.

References

External links

Houses on the National Register of Historic Places in Idaho
Queen Anne architecture in Idaho
Colonial Revival architecture in Idaho
Houses completed in 1900
Bear Lake County, Idaho